Nadežda Mosusova (Nadezda)  (born 4 August 1928) is a Serbian composer and musicologist. She was born in Subotica, Serbia, and studied composition with Predrag Milosevic at the Belgrade Academy of Music. She continued her studies at the Salzburg Seminar on Contemporary American Music and received her doctorate in musicology in Ljubljana. After completing her studies, she took a position as professor at the Stanković Musical School in Belgrade.

References

1928 births
Living people
20th-century classical composers
Serbian music educators
Women classical composers
Serbian composers
Serbian women writers
Serbian non-fiction writers
Serbian musicologists
Women musicologists
Musicians from Subotica
University of Belgrade alumni
University of Ljubljana alumni
Women music educators
20th-century women composers